Clinton Municipal Airport  is a city-owned public-use airport located one nautical mile (2 km) northeast of the central business district of Clinton, a city in Van Buren County, Arkansas, United States.

This airport is included in the FAA's National Plan of Integrated Airport Systems for 2011–2015, which categorized it as a general aviation facility.

Although most U.S. airports use the same three-letter location identifier for the FAA and IATA, this facility is assigned CCA by the FAA but has no designation from the IATA.

Facilities and aircraft 
Clinton Municipal Airport covers an area of 52 acres (21 ha) at an elevation of 514 feet (157 m) above mean sea level. It has one runway designated 13/31 with an asphalt surface measuring 4,012 by 60 feet (1,223 x 18 m).

For the 12-month period ending May 31, 2009, the airport had 10,400 aircraft operations, an average of 28 per day: 96% general aviation and 4% military. At that time there were 25 aircraft based at this airport: 72% single-engine, 24% multi-engine and 4% helicopter.

References

External links 
 Aerial image as of 30 January 2001 from USGS The National Map

Airports in Arkansas
Transportation in Van Buren County, Arkansas
Buildings and structures in Van Buren County, Arkansas